Stradivari is a 1935 German drama film directed by Géza von Bolváry and starring Gustav Fröhlich, Sybille Schmitz and Harald Paulsen.

The film's sets were designed by the art director Emil Hasler. It was shot at the Johannisthal Studios in Berlin. A French-language version Stradivarius produced the same year was also directed by Géza von Bolváry but with a different cast.

Synopsis
In 1914 a Hungarian officer inherits a Stradivarius which is believed to bring back luck to its owner. He and his Italian fiancée are separated by the First World War, and he is badly wounded.

Cast
 Gustav Fröhlich as Sándor Teleki 
 Sybille Schmitz as Maria Belloni 
 Harald Paulsen as Imre Berczy 
 Hilde Krüger as Irene Kardos 
 Albrecht Schoenhals as Dr. Pietro Rossi 
 Hans Leibelt as Professor Hoefer 
 Aribert Wäscher as Carnetti 
 Theodor Loos as Lazarettkommandant 
 Edith Linn as Krankenschwester 
 Heinrich Schroth as Oberst 
 Veit Harlan as Antonio Stradivari
 Fritz Staudte as Nicolo Amati
 Hedda Björnson as Beatrice Amati 
 Angelo Ferrari as Italienischer Offizier 
 Armin Schweizer as Vilmos, alter Diener 
 Armin Münch as Pista, Offiziersbursche 
 Paul Rehkopf as Hotelportier 
 S.O. Schoening as Fürst Nousinoff 
 Marcella Albani as Fürstin Tatjana Nousinoff 
 Fritz Kösling as Marquis Chambort

References

Bibliography 
 Noack, Frank. Veit Harlan: The Life and Work of a Nazi Filmmaker. University Press of Kentucky, 2016.

External links 
 

1935 films
1930s historical drama films
German historical drama films
Films set in the 17th century
Films set in 1914
Films set in 1918
German World War I films
Films of Nazi Germany
1930s German-language films
Films directed by Géza von Bolváry
German black-and-white films
Tobis Film films
Films shot at Johannisthal Studios
Films set in Budapest
Films set in Milan
1935 drama films
1930s German films